Holozoa is a group of organisms that includes animals and their closest single-celled relatives, but  excludes fungi. Holozoa is also an old name for the tunicate genus Distaplia.Because Holozoa is a clade including all organisms more closely related to animals than to fungi, some authors prefer it to recognizing paraphyletic groups that mostly consists of Holozoa minus animals.

Perhaps the best-known holozoans, apart from animals, are the choanoflagellates, which strongly resemble the collar cells of sponges, and so were theorized to be related to sponges even in the 19th century.  Proterospongia is an example of a colonial choanoflagellate that may shed light on the origin of sponges.

The affinities of the other single-celled holozoans only began to be recognized in the 1990s. The sub-classification Ichthyosporea or Mesomycetozoea contains a number of mostly parasitic species.  The amoeboid genera Ministeria and Capsaspora'' may be united in a group called Filasterea by the structure of their thread-like pseudopods.   Along with choanoflagellates, filastereans may be closely related to animals, and one analysis grouped them together as the clade Filozoa.

Phylogeny
The phylogenetic tree based on a 2011 multigene analysis is shown below. It is indicated how many million years ago (Mya) the clades diverged into newer clades. The holomycota tree is following Tedersoo et al.

The alternative hypothesis is the teretosporea clade.

References

 
Opisthokont unranked clades
Ediacaran first appearances